American University of Beirut Press (also known as AUB Press) is a university press supported by American University of Beirut, Lebanon. The press specializes in the publication of monographs and edited collections pertaining to Lebanon and the Middle East.

History
The press in its current form can trace its origin back to 1969, when a formal publications office for the American University of Beirutthe Office of Publicationswas created. In 2001, the university began publishing works under the "American University of Beirut Press" name, and in 2004, the Office of Publications was split into an Office of University Publications (later renamed the "Office of Communications") and the press itself, which answered to the Office of the Provost.

See also

 List of English-language book publishing companies
 List of university presses

References

External links 
American University of Beirut Press

American University of Beirut